Wenceslaus III of Oława (1400 – between 14 January and 28 May 1423), was a Duke of Oława (Ohlau) since 1419–20 until his death.

He was the second son of Henry IX, Duke of Lubin, by his wife Anna, daughter of Przemyslaus I Noszak, Duke of Cieszyn.

Life
After the death of his father between 1419 and 1420, Wenceslaus III and his younger brother Louis III inherited the Duchies of Oława and Niemcza jointly as a co-rulers, His older brother Rupert II received the Duchies of Lubin and Chojnów.

He never married or had issue. On his death, his brother Louis III became in the sole ruler over Oława and Niemcza.

References

1400 births
1423 deaths
Dukes of Silesia
Piast dynasty